Transfiguration is a collaborative album by Artemiy Artemiev and Peter Frohmader, released in 2002 by Electroshock Records.

Track listing

Personnel 
Adapted from the Transfiguration liner notes.
Musicians
 Artemiy Artemiev – keyboards, sampler, programming, musical arrangements, production, recording, engineering, mixing
 Peter Frohmader – bass guitar, electric guitar, keyboards, gongs, musical arrangements, recording, engineering, mixing
Production and additional personnel
 Konstantin Galat – cover art
 Boris Samoilov – mastering

Release history

References 

2002 albums
Collaborative albums
Artemiy Artemiev albums
Peter Frohmader albums